Lecythioscopa is a genus of probable archaeopriapulid known from two specimens from the Walcott Quarry from the Middle Cambrian Burgess Shale.

Morphology 
The specimens of Lectythioscopa are both missing their posterior portions, leaving a head, comparable to the proboscis of other priapulids, and long trunk, which is curved in both specimens. The animal was probably a burrower due to its external radial symmetry.

History 
The species was originally placed as Canadia simplex by Charles Walcott in a 1931 publication based on a single specimen. Simon Conway Morris later identified what was previously considered a specimen of Canadia dubia as sharing similar features, placing them both under the name of Lecythioscopa simplex.

References 

Priapulida
†Lecythioscopa
Prehistoric protostome genera
Burgess Shale fossils
Cambrian genus extinctions

it:Lecythioscopa simplex